Helmut Krcmar (born December 16, 1954) holds the Chair for Information Systems in the Department of Informatics at the Technical University of Munich (TUM), Germany since 2002 with a joint appointment to TUM School of Management. Krcmar served as Dean of the Faculty of Informatics from 10/2010 until 09/2013. In July 2018 he was elected Vice Dean TUM School of Management and Founding Dean TUM Campus Heilbronn. He is academic director of the SAP University Competence Center @ TUM. Krcmar has supervised more than 100 Ph.D. students. He is also speaker of the directory board of Fortiss GmbH, Research Institute of the Free State of Bavaria for Software and Systems.

He is a member of the Data Protection Board of Deutsche Bahn and serves on boards of companies in the IT sector. Krcmar was co-initiator of "CIO Circle", a network of nearly 1,000 chief information officers and was instrumental in launching a new EMBA program together with the EuroCIO network. He is Co-Chairperson of the German National E-Government Competence Center and serves as Chairperson of the Research Committee of Münchner Kreis. He is founder of the IT consultancy Informations- und TechnologieManagement Beratungsgesellschaft, and co-founder of the spin-offs RETIT, Qupe, Tür an Tür Digital Factory.

Career 
Krcmar completed his undergraduate studies in business administration at Saarland University, Saarbrücken, Germany in 1978 and received a Ph.D. in business administration in 1984 from the same institution under the supervision of August-Wilhelm Scheer. He has held positions as post-doctoral fellow at the IBM Los Angeles Scientific Center, as assistant professor of IS at the Leonard Stern School of Business of New York University and at Baruch College of the City University of New York.

From 1987 to 2002 he held the Chair for Information Systems, Hohenheim University, Stuttgart, Germany. At that time Krcmar was the youngest business administration professor in Germany. He served as dean of the Faculty of Business, Economics and Social Sciences from 2000 to 2002 at the same university.

Krcmar was appointed board member of the Center for Digital Technology and Management at TUM in 2004. Until May 2007, he was the academic director of the Executive Training Program Communication and Leadership. As of now, he is academic director of TUM EEC EMBA "Business and IT". Since 2010, Krcmar is a board member of the Open Source Business Alliance.

From 2014 to 2015, Krcmar was president of the Association for Information Systems (AIS). Since inception of the AIS in 1995 he has been actively involved in numerous AIS activities. Krcmar has served in various capacities in the organization of AIS and its conferences. These activities were AIS Council Europe 1996–1997; chairman, ECIS 1996; co-chair, Doctoral Consortium ICIS 1999; program co-chair, ICIS 2000; chair, ECIS Doctoral Consortium 2007; AE ICIS 2008 track ‘Featured Industries’; AE ICIS 2009 ‘Panels’ track; ECIS2014 Industry program chair; ECIS2015 co-chair Doctoral Consortium, co-chair ECIS2017 and co-chair ICIS 2019.

He is a fellow of the Association for Information Systems.

Professional interests 
His research interests include digital transformation, information and knowledge management, platform-based ecosystems, management of IT-based service systems, computer-supported cooperative work, and information systems for government. He is a widely published author (h=56) and serves on numerous editorial boards, such as ACM TMIS, Electronic Markets, ISeB, ISJ, JIT, and JSIS. Krcmar co-authored a plethora of research papers published in major IS journals including MISQ, JMIS, JIT, JSIS, ISJ, I&M, CAIS, TOCHI and BISE. In Germany, his “Information Management” is in a 6th edition (2015). Interdisciplinary work incorporates areas such as accounting, mechanical engineering and health care. Krcmar collaborates in research with a wide range of leading global organizations.

Significant publications 
 Krcmar, H. 2015. Informationsmanagement. 6th Edition. Berlin: Springer.
 Rehäuser, J., and Krcmar, H. 1996. Wissensmanagement in Unternehmen. Lehrstuhl für Wirtschaftsinformatik, Univ. Hohenheim.
 Leimeister, J.M., Huber, M., Bretschneider, U., and Krcmar, H. 2009. "Leveraging Crowdsourcing: Activation-Supporting Components for It-Based Ideas Competition," Journal of Management Information Systems (26:1), pp. 197–224.
 Leimeister, J.M., Ebner, W., and Krcmar, H. 2005. "Design, Implementation, and Evaluation of Trust-Supporting Components in Virtual Communities for Patients," Journal of Management Information Systems (21:4), pp. 101–131.
 Ebner, W., Leimeister, J.M., and Krcmar, H. 2009. "Community Engineering for Innovations: The Ideas Competition as a Method to Nurture a Virtual Community for Innovations," R&D Management (39:4), pp. 342–356.

References

External links 
Helmut Krcmar, TU München on www.winfobase.de

1954 births
Living people
Information systems researchers
Academic staff of the Technical University of Munich
People from Hanau